Destruction (2018) was a series of professional wrestling events promoted by New Japan Pro-Wrestling (NJPW). In 2018 NJPW promoted three events: Destruction in Hiroshima on September 15, Destruction in Beppu on September 17 and Destruction in Kobe on September 23. These were events eighteen to twenty in the Destruction chronology.

Production

Background
2018 is the third consecutive year in which NJPW hold three events under the Destruction name. From 2007 to 2013 NJPW held one event per year, expanding to two shows in 2014 and to three shows in 2016.

Storylines
The three Destruction events will feature nine professional wrestling matches each that will involve different wrestlers from pre-existing scripted feuds and storylines. Wrestlers portray villains, heroes, or less distinguishable characters in the scripted events that build tension and culminate in a wrestling match or series of matches.

Destruction in Hiroshima
On the fourteenth day of the G1 Climax, Tomohiro Ishii defeated the IWGP Heavyweight Champion Kenny Omega, handing him his first loss in the tournament. On the tournament's final day, Ishii challenged Omega to a title match with him accepting.

Destruction in Beppu
At Dominion 6.9 in Osaka-jo Hall, Hirooki Goto lost the NEVER Openweight Championship to Michael Elgin in a three-way match also involving Taichi, with Elgin pinning Taichi to win the title. Goto got a rematch in a singles match against Elgin at the next tour, Kizuna Road, defeating him and regaining the title. On the final day of the G1 Climax, Taichi challenged Goto to a title match.

At Wrestling Hinokuni, Tetsuya Naito defeated Minoru Suzuki to win the IWGP Intercontinental Championship. On the eighteenth day of the G1 Climax (final day of Block B), Suzuki's stablemate Zack Sabre Jr. defeated Naito eliminating him from the tournament. On the G1 Climax's final day, Naito's stable Los Ingobernables de Japón defeated Suzuki-gun in an eight-man tag team match, with Suzuki focusing his attention on attacking Naito. Having already lost to Sabre Jr. in the New Japan Cup earlier in the year Naito wanted a rematch with him, claiming to be disinterested in Suzuki for already having defeated him. However, he is facing Suzuki in a special singles match.

Destruction in Kobe
At the G1 Special in San Francisco, the IWGP Junior Heavyweight Champion Hiromu Takahashi injured his neck in a title defense against Dragon Lee. He was forced to relinquish the title, with a four-man tournament being announced to crown a new champion. Kushida will face Bushi in the first semifinal, with the winner advancing to the final to be held at King of Pro-Wrestling to face the winner of the second semifinal (either Will Ospreay or Marty Scurll).

On the seventeenth day of the G1 Climax (final day of the Block A), the match between Kazuchika Okada and Hiroshi Tanahashi ended in a time-limit draw, with Tanahashi advancing to the final and eventually winning the tournament. With Tanahashi unable to defeat Okada in their last four encounters, including in a match for the IWGP Heavyweight Championship at Wrestling Dontaku earlier in the year, he nominated Okada as his first opponent to defend the Tokyo Dome IWGP Heavyweight Championship challenge rights certificate.

Results

Destruction in Hiroshima

Destruction in Beppu

Destruction in Kobe

References

External links
Official New Japan Pro-Wrestling website

2018 in professional wrestling
September 2018 events in Japan
NJPW Destruction